Ian Andrew Wright (born 9 December 1961) is a former New Zealand rower who won an Olympic bronze medal at the 1988 Summer Olympics in Seoul. Wright has won 31 national titles during his career. After his rowing career ended, he became a coach and his Swiss lightweight men's four team won gold at the 2016 Summer Olympics. He is now Australia's head rowing coach announced in September 2016. He immediately coached the Australian men's four to a gold medal at the 2017 world rowing championships (Sarasota, Florida).

Rowing career
Wright was born in 1961 in Wanganui, New Zealand. He moved to Hamilton and became a member of the Hamilton Rowing Club. He had Harry Mahon as his rowing coach.

Wright won two medals at the 1986 Commonwealth Games in Edinburgh. He won silver with Barrie Mabbott in the coxless pair and bronze in the eight. At the 1988 Summer Olympics, Wright won bronze in the coxed four along with George Keys, Greg Johnston, Chris White and Andrew Bird (cox).

At the 1989 World Rowing Championships at Bled, Yugoslavia, he won a bronze in the men's four with Bill Coventry, Alastair Mackintosh, and Campbell Clayton-Greene.

At the 1992 Summer Olympics in Barcelona, Wright finished 11th in the coxed four. At the 1996 Summer Olympics in Atlanta, he came 13th in the coxless four.

During his career, he has won a total of 31 New Zealand titles with the coxed eight (12 titles), coxed four (7 titles), coxless four (7 titles), coxless pair (2 titles), and coxed pair (3 titles).

Coaching career
A teacher, Wright was involved in rowing coaching school and age-group at national level. He coached several Maadi Cup winning squads at both St Paul's Collegiate School and Hamilton Boys' High School. He is described as "intense" and speaks his mind, which does not sit well with some people. He is held in high regard by those who have been coached by him.

From 2005 to 2009, Wright was head coach at the Melbourne University Boat Club. Wright worked for Rowing New Zealand as coach for the men's eight, and was head coach at the Waikato Regional Performance Centre with training at Lake Karapiro. In late 2014, Wright was appointed head national coach of Switzerland. He led the lightweight men's four to become the 2015 world champions. A year later, the same boat won Olympic gold at the Rio Olympics. In September 2016, he was appointed head rowing coach for Australia's men. Within a year of Wright starting in Australia, the Australian men's four—consisting of Joshua Hicks, Spencer Turrin, Jack Hargreaves and Alexander Hill—won gold at the 2017 World Rowing Championships in Sarasota, Florida. Until 2017, Australia had not won a World Championship in the Men's Coxless Four since 1991 in Vienna, Austria.

In July 2018, Wright coached the Australian Men's Eight to a win in the Grand Challenge Cup at Henley Royal Regatta. Beating the Romanian National Eight in the Final, Australia would also go on to claim the course record in a time of 5:53 while being in the arguably less-favoured Buckinghamshire lane. This same year at the 2018 World Rowing Championships in Plovdiv, Bulgaria the Australian Men's Four won another gold medal giving them back to back World Champion titles.

References

1961 births
Living people
New Zealand male rowers
Olympic rowers of New Zealand
Olympic bronze medalists for New Zealand
Rowers at the 1988 Summer Olympics
Rowers at the 1992 Summer Olympics
Rowers at the 1996 Summer Olympics
Commonwealth Games silver medallists for New Zealand
Commonwealth Games bronze medallists for New Zealand
Rowers at the 1986 Commonwealth Games
Olympic medalists in rowing
World Rowing Championships medalists for New Zealand
Medalists at the 1988 Summer Olympics
Commonwealth Games medallists in rowing
Rowing coaches
Medallists at the 1986 Commonwealth Games